The Ramon Torres National High School (RTNHS) (Filipino: Pambansang Mataas na Paaralang Ramon Torres) is one of the 7 functioning public secondary schools of Bago. Located in Gen. Luna St., Brgy. Balingasag, Bago, it provides free secondary education for the people of the city and neighboring towns with focus on secondary basic education.

History

After almost sixty years of quality service to the public, Ramon Torres National High School has undergone an evolution of names. It was originally named Bago Junior High School then, Bago High School, Bago Community High School, and Bago City High School.

With the implementation of Resolution No. 1310 series of 1977 passed by the Sanguniang Panlungsod of Bago and approved by the President of the Philippines Ferdinand E. Marcos, the school became Ramon Torres Memorial High School. The name of the school is a living legacy of its chief founder, ex-Senator Ramon Torres whose brilliant mind gave birth to the establishment of the school.

In July 1983, Ramon Torres Memorial High School was again converted by virtue of Batas Pambansa 411 entitled "An Act of Converting the Ramon Torres Memorial High School in the City of Bago, Province of Negros Occidental into a National High School to be known as the Ramon Torres National High School."

There had been changes not only in the name but also in there Secondary Curriculum since the establishment of Ramon Torres National High School. The school started with the General Secondary Curriculum. In 1959, the general secondary (2-2) plan took effect. Department Order No. 20, s. 1973 implemented the Revised Secondary Education Curriculum in 1973 and school year 1976 marked the implementation of the New Curriculum as Department Order No. 40. This program offers one elective in the second year and two in the third year and fourth year or a total of five electives which a student has to take aside from his regular load before he can graduate.

The Secondary Education and Development Program (SEDP) or otherwise known as the National Secondary Education Curriculum was implemented in 1989, thus, school year 1991-1992 marked the end of the 1973 Revised Secondary Curriculum.

From a simple vision, the school started with a population of 244 students, 124 boys and 120 girls in the school year 1947–1948. In its Silver Jubilee, the school had reached 2,285 students.

As the school turned on its 50th year, it had a total population of 8,807 students, including its six extension schools: RT Dulao National High School, Rt Malingin National High School, RT Taloc National High School, RT Sagasa National High School, RT Ma-ao Sugar Central National High School, and RT Louisiana National High School.

To congest the RTNHS Main as well as to minimize expenses among students residing at Barangay Dulao and Barangay Malingin, Resolution No. 1430 dated May 17, 1978 has approved and authorized the establishment of the two extension classes which started on school year 1978–1979.

In 1979, another extension schools were again established at Barangay Sagasa and Barangay Taloc. There were approximately 4,000 high school students at the Main School for school year 1980-1981 and approximately 800 of these students resides at Barangay Ma-ao Central and its neighboring barangays. Due to this, the city school administration and city government officials have decided to open an extension school at Barangay Ma-ao Central by virtue of Resolution No. 1886 series of 1980 and Resolution No. 1971 series of 1981. The RTHNS MSC Extension started its operation school year 1981–1982.

Due to the existing cost of secondary education in private schools located at Barangay Ma-ao, the Sanguniang Panlungsod, recognizing the immediate need, resolve to establish a less expensive public high school located at the Louisiana Elementary School campus effective school year 1984-1985 by virtue of Resolution No. 2562 series of 1984.

Just after the acquisition of the school site, buildings have flourished through the support and joint efforts of Hon. City Mayor Manuel Y. Torres, Hon. Congressman Edward M. Matti, PTA Officials and NGO's.

Improvements in the institutional facilities are visible under the administration of the present Principal, Miss Heidi M. Estandarte. Vehicles, intercoms and classrooms were obtained from donations of the Department of Education, Culture and Sports.

After sixty years of Ramon Torres National High School, the brainchild of Sen. Ramon Torres, it is now one of the best and biggest schools in Western Visayas.

To better serve the city and its neighboring communities, the Schools Division Office has authorized the opening of additional public secondary schools including RT Malingin National High School - Atipuluan Extension, RT Bagroy National High School, and the stand-alone Bago City Senior High School.

Founders and Benefactors
Ex-Senator Ramon Torres
Mr. Angel Sala
Ex-Mayor Carlos Dreyfus
Ex-Mayor Luis Matti
Hon. Romualdo Araneta
Ex-Mayor Jose T. Yulo
Mr. Mauricio Milabo, Sr.
Miss Laura V. Javellana
Mr. Woodrow Araneta
Mr. Beato Dormido
Mr. Sotico Lamela
Mr. Cesar Bico
Dr. Maximiano Villanueva
Mr. Ricardo Montinola

Past and Present Administrators

Principals
Mr. Simplicio Arquero, Principal - 1947-1959
Miss Piedad S. Villanueva, Principal - 1960-1961
Mr. Jorge M. Martir, Teacher-in-Charge - 1961-1962
Mr. Alfredo Corral, Principal - 1962-1968
Miss Elisa T. Dreyfus, Principal - 1968-1975
Miss Ninfa T. Jardinico, Principal III - 1975-August 1993
Miss Heidi M. Estandarte, Principal IV - Sept. 1, 1993-Sept. 1, 2010
Dr. Portia M. Mallorca, Assistant Schools Division Superintendent/Officer-in-Charge - Sept. 2, 2010-May 2011
Mr. Fortunato M. Filomeno, Principal IV - May 2011–May 2018
Mr. Elmer B. Cabiles, Public Schools District Supervisor/Officer-in-Charge - May 2018-July 2019
Dr. Jonaida V. Gasendo, Principal III - July 2019 – present

Department Heads

English
Mrs. Nenita Villanueva - 1980-1990
Miss Rosario E. Rodrigo (OIC) - 1990
Mrs. Chita V. Gico - 1990-2005
Mrs. Merilyn M. Gonzaga - 2005-2011
Mrs. Gemma P. Guanzon (OIC) - 2011-2013
Mrs. Giselle G. Sabusap - 2013–2018
Mrs. Ma. Lourdes C. Almojen - 2018–present

Filipino
Miss Violeta F. Pahilanga - 1980-2006
Miss Rosela M. Besa - 2006-2013
Mr. Raymund L. Santiago (OIC) - 2013-2015
Mrs. Gemmalyn E. Navas - 2015–present

Mathematics
Mrs. Eva P. Torres - 1980-2002
Mrs. Alicia E. Sigueza (OIC) - 2002
Mrs. Dioreta T. Trojillo - 2002–2014
Mrs. Felga O. Flores (OIC)- 2014-2018
Mrs. Euniles B. Martinez - 2018–present

Science and Technology
Miss Heidi M. Estandarte - 1980-1984
Miss Olivia R. Olorga - 1984-2002
Mr. Fortunato M. Filomeno (OIC) - 2002
Mrs. Ma. Ana C. Ebon - 2002-2013
Miss Celma S. Dela Cruz (OIC) - 2013
Mrs. Lourdes V. Satera - 2013–2018
Mrs. Gemma Fe S. Torres - 2018–present

Social Studies and Values Education
Miss Trinidad Y. Javellana - 1980-2004
Dr. Guadalupe L. Aldeguer - 2004-2008
Mrs. Virginia B. Bedia - 2008-2013
Mrs. Jonaida V. Gasendo (OIC) - 2013-2014
Mrs. Judith G. Espende (Araling Panlipunan) - 2014-2018
Mrs. Maria Therese Y. Trojillo (Araling Panlipunan) - 2018–present
Mrs. Medelyn B. Cruz (Edukasyon sa Pagpapakatao) - 2014–present

Music, Arts, Physical Education and Health (MAPEH) / Citizenship Advancement Training (CAT)
Mrs. Lourdes J. Balceda - 1980-2010
Mrs. Eleanor T. Zamora - 2010–2014
Mrs. Yonnie V. Makilan - 2014–2019
Mr. Eliseo R. Yanong (OIC) - 2019-2020
Mr. Paul Elijah G. Casiano - 2020–present

Technology and Livelihood Education (TLE)
Mrs. Lydia L. Matti - 1980-2000
Mrs. Cecilia C. Narazo - 2000-2008
Mrs. Agnes A. Denila - 2008–2019
Mr. Ramie F. Pahilga - 2019–present

Guidance Services
Mrs. Barbara Pat E. Mondia - 1980-1988
Mrs. Nora J. Flores - 1988–Present

Curriculum

The Ramon Torres National High School implements the Basic Education Curriculum (BEC) as prescribed by the Department of Education of the Philippines.

¹RTNHS offers the following TLE courses in Grade 9 and Grade Ten levels including: Culinary Arts, Dressmaking, Cosmetology, Nursing Arts, Related Crafts, Industrial Arts, Agricultural Arts, Entrepreneurship, Computer Education

Administration

The Ramon Torres National High School is administrated by a secondary school principal. The current administrator is Dr. Jonaida V. Gasendo. There are also 9 department heads for academic, support and administrative units of the institution.

School Heads
Principal III: Dr. Jonaida V. Gasendo
Assistant Principal II in Academics, Senior High School: Mrs. Girlie A. Panaguiton
Assistant Principal II in Operations and Learners Support, Senior High School: Dr. Mary Jane A. Araneta

Department Heads
Head Teacher V, English Dept.: Mrs. Ma. Lourdes C. Almojen
Head Teacher VI, Mathematics Dept.: Mrs. Euniles B. Martinez
Head Teacher IV, Science Dept.: Mrs. Gemma Fe S. Torres
Head Teacher IV, Filipino Dept.: Mrs. Gemmalyn E. Navas
Head Teacher III, AP Dept.: Mrs. Maria Therese Y. Trojillo
Head Teacher IV, ESP Dept.: Mrs. Medelyn B. Cruz
Head Teacher I, MAPEH Dept.: Mr. Paul Elijah G. Casiano 
Head Teacher V, TLE Dept.: Mr. Ramie F. Pahilga
Guidance Coordinator III: Mrs. Nora J. Flores
Administrative Officer IV: Mrs. Nelin D. Lupasi
Accountant I: Mrs. Elizabeth A. Togonon, CPA

Sections

The Ramon Torres National High School has 30 sections for the Grade Seven level, 23 sections in Grade Eight, 20 sections for the Grade Nine and 18 sections in Grade Ten. Each sections is facilitated by a Section Adviser and each year level is supervised by a Class Adviser usually assumed by the Section Adviser of the first section.

High schools in Negros Occidental
Public schools in the Philippines